Wesley Oliveira de Carvalho (born 4 June 1974) is a Brazilian football manager, currently the assistant manager of Athletico Paranaense.

Career
Born in Itapetinga, Bahia, Carvalho played was a goalkeeper in Vitória's youth setup, being Dida's backup during the 1993 Copa São Paulo de Futebol Júnior. He never played professionally during his career, but still joined the very same club in 1997, as a goalkeeping coach.

Carvalho left the club in 2003, and returned on two more occasions, being manager of the under-17s and the under-20s in the latter. On 20 May 2015, after Claudinei Oliveira's dismissal, he was named interim manager of the main squad in the Série B; he left the post a couple of weeks later, with three wins in four matches.

On 2 May 2017, Carvalho was again interim of the first team, replacing sacked Argel Fucks. Late in the month, after winning the year's Campeonato Baiano, he moved to Palmeiras and took over the under-20 squad. In October, he became Alberto Valentim's assistant in the first team, but returned to his previous role ahead of the 2018 season.

In July 2018, Carvalho was Verdãos interim for one match, a 3–0 win over Paraná. On 24 August 2021, he left the club on a mutual agreement.

On 25 January 2022, it was announced that Carvalho would be the new under-20 manager of Santos, but instead he moved to Athletico Paranaense to become their under-23 manager on 9 February. On 5 May, after the club dismissed assistants Maurício Souza and Bruno Lazaroni, he was named interim head coach of the side for one match.

Honours
Vitória
Campeonato Baiano: 2017

References

External links

1974 births
Living people
Sportspeople from Bahia
Brazilian football managers
Campeonato Brasileiro Série A managers
Campeonato Brasileiro Série B managers
Esporte Clube Vitória managers
Sociedade Esportiva Palmeiras managers
Club Athletico Paranaense managers